Aubigny may refer to:

Places in Australia

Aubigny, North Quay, a historic house in Brisbane, Queensland, Australia
Aubigny, Queensland, a town in Toowoomba Region, Queensland, Australia
County of Aubigny, a county in Queensland, Australia
Electoral district of Aubigny, an electoral district in Queensland, Australia

Places in Canada
Aubigny, Manitoba, a small community in the province of Manitoba

Places in France
Aubigny, Allier, a commune
Aubigny, Calvados, a commune
Aubigny, Deux-Sèvres, a commune
 , a former seigneurie and commune
 
Aubigny, Somme, a commune
Aubigny, Vendée, a former commune

See also
Duke of Aubigny
Aubigny-au-Bac, Nord
Aubigny-aux-Kaisnes, Aisne
Aubigny-en-Artois, Pas-de-Calais
Aubigny-en-Laonnois, Aisne 
Aubigny-en-Plaine, Côte-d'Or
Aubigny-la-Ronce, Côte-d'Or
Aubigny-les-Pothées, Ardennes
Aubigny-lès-Sombernon, Côte-d'Or
Aubigny-sur-Nère, Cher